Halstead–Bentley USD 440 is a public unified school district headquartered in Halstead, Kansas, United States.  The district includes the communities of Halstead, Bentley, and nearby rural areas.

Schools
The school district operates the following schools:
 Halstead High School (9-12)
 Halstead Middle School (4-8)
 Bentley Primary School (K-3)

See also
 Kansas State Department of Education
 Kansas State High School Activities Association
 List of high schools in Kansas
 List of unified school districts in Kansas

References

External links
 

School districts in Kansas
Education in Harvey County, Kansas